Ampittia nanus is a species of butterfly in the family Hesperiidae. It was described by John Henry Leech in 1890. It is found in China. One of the two marginal rows of spots of the forewing in cellules 5, 6 and 7, or 6, 7 and 8, the other in cellule 2 and 3: no light spot in cellule 4. A spot in the cell near the upper angle ash colour.

References

Butterflies described in 1890
Ampittia
Butterflies of Asia